Vanessa Ware (born 26 October 1985) is a former Australian netball player. Between 2003 and 2007 she played for Sydney Swifts in the Commonwealth Bank Trophy league. She was a member of the Sydney Swifts teams that won premierships in 2004, 2006, 2007. Between 2008 and 2013 she played for New South Wales Swifts in the ANZ Championship. She was a member of the Swifts team that won the  2008 ANZ Championship. She also represented Australia at under-19, under-21 and Fast5 levels.

Early life, family and education
Ware is originally from Sutherland Shire. Ware and her future team mate, Kimberlee Green have been best friends since meeting at Little Athletics when they were seven. Ware attended De La Salle College, Cronulla.

Playing career

Early years
Ware played netball for both De La Salle College, Cronulla and the New South Wales Institute of Sport.

Sydney Swifts
Between 2003 and 2007, Ware made 40 appearances for Sydney Swifts in the Commonwealth Bank Trophy league. She was 16 when she began playing for the Sydney Swifts first team. She made her senior debut for Swifts on 26 July 2003  in a Round 10 match against Perth Orioles. She came on at wing attack in a game Swifts won 67–41.
She was subsequently a member of the Sydney Swifts teams that won premierships in 2004, 2006, 2007.

New South Wales Swifts
Between 2008 and 2013, Ware made 67 appearances for New South Wales Swifts in the ANZ Championship.  She was a member of the Swifts team that won the 2008 ANZ Championship.  During 2010, Ware suffered from back and knee injuries which ended her season early. However she recovered and returned in 2011.  In 2012, Ware and Kimberlee Green celebrated ten consecutive seasons with Sydney Swifts/New South Wales Swifts. Ware subsequently played her 50th ANZ Championship match in a 2012 Round 9 match against Melbourne Vixens.  2013 was Ware's eleventh and final season with Sydney Swifts/New South Wales Swifts. She played her 100th game for Swifts against Southern Steel in Round 7. After 107 games, Ware retired from elite netball after the Round 14 game against Canterbury Tactix.

Australia
In 2004 Ware represented Australia at under-19 level.  In 2006 she was included in the Australia under-21 squad.  In 2008 she was included in the senior squad.  Ware also represented Australia at the 2011 World Netball Series.

Honours
New South Wales Swifts
ANZ Championship
Winners: 2008
Sydney Swifts
Commonwealth Bank Trophy
Winners: 2004, 2006, 2007
Runners up: 2003, 2005

References

1985 births
Living people
Australian netball players
Australia international Fast5 players
Sydney Swifts players
New South Wales Swifts players
ANZ Championship players
Netball players from Sydney
People from the Sutherland Shire
New South Wales Institute of Sport netball players
People educated at De La Salle College, Cronulla